Newnham Murren is a hamlet in the Thames Valley in South Oxfordshire, about  east of the market town of Wallingford. Newnham Murren is in the civil parish of Crowmarsh and is now contiguous with the village of Crowmarsh Gifford.

History
Newnham Murren is an ancient parish, recorded in Domesday Book as Niweham. The Church of England parish church of St Mary was built in the 12th century. Newnham Murren was a strip parish: a thin strip of land extending into the Chiltern Hills including part of Stoke Row. Newnham Murren was made a civil parish in the 19th century, but in 1932 the civil parish was absorbed into the new civil parish of Crowmarsh.

See also
St Mary's Church, Newnham Murren

References

External links

Villages in Oxfordshire
Populated places on the River Thames
Former civil parishes in Oxfordshire
Wallingford, Oxfordshire